Dark Odyssey is a 1961 American erotic drama film directed by Radley Metzger.

Plot
An immigrant from Greece arrives in New York City to search for the man who mistreated his sister.

Cast 
 Athan Karras as Yianni Martakis
 Jeanne Jerrems as Niki Vassos
 David Hooks as George Andros
 Rosemary Torri as Helen Vassos
 Edward Brazier as Jack Fields
 Nicholas Zapnoukayas as Mr. Vassos
 Ariadne Zapnoukayas as Mrs. Vassos

Reception
Dark Odyssey was favorably reviewed by The New York Times. According to film reviewer Howard Thompson, the film is a "thoughtful, unpretentious and creatively turned little drama ... a fresh, economical approach to an ancient dramaturgical formula". Gary Morris, another film reviewer, describes the film as having "visual beauty and emotional power" and being a "literal Greek tragedy shot on location in New York City". Film critic Dan Georgakas describes the film as the "best film featuring Greek American characters ever made". Dark Odyssey has been described, by one reviewer, as having a neorealistic style similar to Elia Kazan On the Waterfront (1954) and Martin Ritt Edge of the City (1957).

Notes
According to one film reviewer, Radley Metzger's films, including those made during the Golden Age of Porn (1969–1984), are noted for their "lavish design, witty screenplays, and a penchant for the unusual camera angle". Another reviewer noted that his films were "highly artistic — and often cerebral ... and often featured gorgeous cinematography". Film and audio works by Metzger have been added to the permanent collection of the Museum of Modern Art (MoMA) in New York City.

References

External links
 
 Dark Odyssey at  MUBI (related to The Criterion Collection)

American erotic drama films
Films directed by Radley Metzger
1961 films
1960s erotic drama films
1961 drama films
1960s English-language films
1960s American films